Branta is a genus of birds, collectively known as black geese.

Branta may also refer to:

Branta (journal), an ornithological publication
Cathy Branta (born 1963), American runner

See also 
Brant (disambiguation)